Jean Philippe Piter (born 4 April 1968) is a French photographer known for his fine art nudes. Alongside his work as a photographer and artist, he is also the founder and Art Director of the magazine PURE ST BARTH which was first published in 2003.

Biography 
Jean Philippe Piter born on 4 April 1968 in Dakar, Senegal. At the age of 16, he left Dakar and moved to France where he began his studies in photography. He was assistant to many known photographers in the industry such as Michel Comte, Jacques Durand and Yann Arthus-Bertrand.

He has crossed the pages of AD, Citizen K, Vanity Fair, W magazine, PHOTO magazine, Numéro, and Vogue UK to name a few and has shot advertising campaigns for Google Glass and Audemars Piguet.
His work has been published in several books including The Eye of St Barth, Liaigre 2 (Flammarion), Liaigre 3,(Flammarion) Living in Delphi (Assouline), The Eye of Saint-Barth (Pure).
He is represented by Space Gallery St Barth where his fine art photography is showcased and sold.
 Artsy Editorial – "Hold Your Breath for Jean-Philippe Piter’s Underwater Fantasy"

References 

3. "Jean-Philippe Piter". Space Gallery St Barth. www.spacegstbarth.com.

External links 
 Official Website
 Jean Philippe Piter in ARTSY
 "Pure St Barth" Magazine – Official Website

French photographers
1968 births
Living people